Holodactylus africanus, also known as the African clawed gecko, Boettger's strong-clawed gecko, or African whole-toed gecko, is a species of gecko that is commonly found in Eastern Africa. The gecko has a big head, thin body, stumpy tail, and has tan and brown bands. The adults are 3 and a half to four inches long.

References

Holodactylus
Reptiles described in 1893